Eustace Street  is a street in the Temple Bar area of Dublin, Ireland.

Location
Eustace Street runs from Wellington Quay (near Millennium Bridge) to Dame Street, with junctions with Essex Street East and Curved Street.

At the halfway point of the street there is a passageway to Meetinghouse Square.

History
Eustace Street takes its name from Sir Maurice Eustace (c. 1590 – 1665), former Lord Chancellor of Ireland, whose townhouse "Damask" and its gardens once stood on the site. The street was laid out prior to 1701 but legal issues held up the initial construction. A map of 1728 shows the street as fully built.

The street is known for its association with the Religious Society of Friends, or Quakers. In 1692, the Quakers in Dublin established a meeting house on Sycamore Alley, off Dame Street and later expanded onto Eustace Street. Eustace Street also once housed a Presbyterian/Unitarian church, which moved there from New Row in 1728; John Leland was a pastor there.

In the 18th century, Eustace Street was the site of the Eagle Tavern, which was the site of the founding of the Dublin Society of United Irishmen.

The street addresses were renumbered in the 1840s.

In recent years the street has become a cultural centre, housing the Irish Film Institute and The Ark. Fishamble: The New Play Company are located at 1 Eustace Street.

Cultural references
Eustace Street appears twice in the work of James Joyce:

Irish band Delorentos released a single entitled "Eustace Street" in 2007.

Gallery

See also

Quakers in Ireland
List of streets and squares in Dublin

Notes

References

Streets in Dublin (city)